Jeju Olle Trail (Korean: 제주올레길) is a long-distance footpath on Jeju Island, an island off the south-west coast of South Korea. The route follows the coastline and consists of 21 connected numbered main routes, 6 sub-routes, and a short spur that connects to Jeju International Airport. On average, the routes are 16km in length and in total amount to 437km. The exact length and locations change over time as trails are modified or re-routed. Jeju Olle Trail was founded by ex-journalist Suh Myung-suk.

History 
Jeju Olle Trail was founded by ex-journalist Suh Myung-suk. Camino de Santiago is a UNESCO World Heritage site. Suh Myung-su followed this example and established the Jeju Olle Foundation after investigating Jeju-Si Island to develop tourist routes such as the Santiago Pilgrimage route in South Korea. The Jeju Olle Foundation operates the plan to develop a new route for the Jeju Olle Trail. The procedure includes choosing the correct walking path, connecting them to create a route, expanding the width of the path, and removing obstacles.

Routes

Siheung - Gwangchigi Olle (Korean: 시흥-광치기 올레)

Siheung - Gwangchigi Olle route is 15.1 km long.

Jeju Olle’s first route connects Oreums to the ocean. The route starts near Siheung Elementary School and connects to an evergreen field, Malmi Oreum(small extinct volcano) and Al Oreum(small extinct volcano) with a panoramic view of Seongsan Ilchulbong(peak) and U-do Island.

U-do (island) - Olle (Korean: 우도-올레)

U-do (island) - Olle route has a distance of 11.3 km. This is a sub-route of Siheung - Gwangchigi Olle route.

This sub-route requires a 15-minute ferry ride from Seongsan Port to the island of Udo.

Gwangchigi - Onpyeong Olle (Korean: 광치기-온평 올레) 

Gwangchigi - Onpyeong Olle route has a distance of 15.2 km.

Starting at Gwangchigi Beach, the trail passes Siksan-bong(peak), Daesusan-bong(peak), Honinji(wedding pond) to a small beach in Onpyeong-ri. The attraction continues with path across the field along inland water and mountain path.

Onpyeong - Pyoseon Olle (Korean: 온평-표선 올레) 

Onpyeong - Pyoseon Olle has a distance of 20.9 km.

This route connects Tong Oreum (a small, extinct volcano) to Dokja-bong (peak), where it includes a camellia path, a mandarin path, and other kinds of walking paths. This route also continues until the Kim Young Gap Gallery Dumoak.

Pyoseon - Namwon Olle (Korean: 표선-남원 올레) 

Pyoseon - Namwon Olle route has a distance of 19.0 km.

Namwon - Soesokkak Olle (Korean: 남원-쇠소깍 올레) 

Namwon - Soesokkak Olle has a distance of 13.4 km.

The route goes on from Namwon to Keun-ung (hill) Walkway and Soesokkak Estuary where freshwater and seawater comes together.

Soesokkak - Jeju Olle Tourist Center Olle (Korean: 쇠소깍-제주올레 여행자센터 올레) 

This route has a distance of 11.0 km.
The route goes along coast and through downtown starting at Soesokkak-dari (bridge) and passing through Seogwipo City. Past Lee, Jung-seop Street, the route continues to Jeju Olle Tourist Center.

Jeju Olle Tourist Center - Wolpyeong Olle (Korean: 제주올레 여행자센터-월평 올레)

This route has a distance of 17.6 km.

It is a coastal Olle starting at Jeju Olle Tourist Center, passing through Beophwan-pogu(port) and finishing at Wolpyeong. Near the start of this trail is the rock spire of Oedolgae and its surrounding cliffs.

Wolpyeong - Daepyeong Olle (Korean: 월평-대평 올레) 

Wolpyeong - Daepyeong Olle has a distance of 19.6 km.

This Badang Olle(seaside walk) begins at the natural springs of Nonjitmul passing through the coastal roads. This route includes Joosang Jeolli where lava flowed to the ocean cooled down to form striking hexagonal columns of basalt and the Yerae Ecological Park full of seasonal flowers.

Daepyeong - Hwasun Olle (Korean: 대평-화순 올레) 

Daepyeong - Hwasun Olle has a distance of 6.7 km.

Hwasun - Moseulpo Olle (Korean: 화순-모슬포 올레) 

Hwasun - Moseulpo Olle has a distance of 15.6 km.

This coastal route begins at the Hwasun Golden Sand Beach and ends at Hamo-ri in Daejeong-eup. The route passes by Sseokeun-dari(bridge), Hwangwoochi Beach, Sanbang-san(mountain) and Songak-san.

Moseulpo - Mureung Olle (Korean: 모슬포-무릉 올레) 

Moseulpo - Mureung Olle has a distance of 17.3 km.

Starting at Hamo Sports Park, the route connects Moseul-bong and Sinpyeong forest to Mureung Farm.  On top of Moseul-bong(peak), visitors can see the Oreums and sea of Southwest Jeju.

Mureung - Yongsu Olle  (Korean: 무릉-용수 올레) 

Mureung - Yongsu Olle has a distance of 17.5 km.

It is the first route to enter Jeju City, after connecting the entire Seogwipo City along the coast. From Mureung-2ri to Jeolbuam at Yonsu-pogu(port), the route continues through field, ocean, and an oreum.

Sign Post
As Jeju Olle is a road where hikers walk freely along the road, Jeju Olle Foundation offers several signposts to help the tourist to provide the information of the route.

Ganse 
Ganse is the name of Jeju’s pony. The word comes from Ganse-dari, meaning slow idler in Jeju. Ganse points toward the direction of the route at a forked road. At points of tourist attractions, Ganse located with the description of the site.

Ribbon 
Vibrant blue ribbons representing Jeju ocean and orange ribbons symbolizing Jeju tangerines are tied to trees and utility poles. Ribbons are hung at a height, above the eye level.

Arrow 
Blue arrow on the ground, stonewall and utility poles is the basic symbol that guides hikers along the Jeju Olle Trail. Orange arrows point in the reverse direction of the trail. This is the post that visitors should follow, when hiking from the finishing point to the starting point.

Wheelchair Accessible Area Signpost 
An S on Ganse’s saddle indicates the starting point of wheelchair accessible area and F for the finishing point. The wheelchair sticker is put on the blue arrows which indicate forward directions.

Stamp Ganse 
There are Ganse-shaped stamp stations with signature stamps of each route at the starting points, mid-points, and finishing points of each route. Finisher's certificate and a medal are given to the tourists who collected three stamps on Jeju Olle Passport.

International Awards

Jeju Olle Trail won the inaugural International Award at the 21st International Trails Symposium in 2013 for working diligently to develop trails since its founding in 2007.

World Trails Conference
Jeju Olle Trail has hosted the International Trails Conference every year since its inception in 2010 and attracts trail experts from all over the world.

See also
 John Muir Trail
 Bruce Trail
 Cotswold Way

References

External links
 Jeju Olle English home page
 World Trails Network home page
 Jeju Olle Walking Festival
 A rating/ranking of all 24 courses by one reporter/hiker in October, 2011.
 Updated news and information about Jeju Olle Trail in English
 Jeju Olle official English trail guide

Tourist attractions in Jeju Province
Geography of Jeju Province
Hiking trails in South Korea